The Virginia Slims of Kansas is a defunct WTA Tour affiliated tennis tournament played from 1978 to 1990. It was held in Kansas City, Kansas in the United States from 1978 to 1983 and in Wichita, Kansas in the United States from 1986 to 1990, and was played on indoor hard courts in 1978 and from 1988 to 1990, on indoor carpet courts from 1980 to 1982 and from 1986 to 1987, and on outdoor hard courts in 1983.

Martina Navratilova was a player at the tournament, winning the singles competition three times and the doubles competitions twice partnering American Billie Jean King.

Past finals

Singles

Doubles

References
 WTA Results Archive

 
Hard court tennis tournaments
Carpet court tennis tournaments
Indoor tennis tournaments
Recurring sporting events established in 1978
Recurring events disestablished in 1990
Defunct tennis tournaments in the United States
Virginia Slims tennis tournaments
1978 establishments in Kansas
1990 disestablishments in Kansas